City University may refer to:

City University of Hong Kong
City University, Malaysia
City, University of London
City University of New York
City University of Seattle
University City of Caracas
City University of Macau
City University Bangladesh
 City University of Istanbul

Other city universities:

Birmingham City University
Dublin City University
Kansas City University
Oakland City University
Oklahoma City University
Nagoya City University
New Jersey City University
Osaka City University
Pamantasan ng Lungsod ng Maynila (University of the City of Manila)

Ciudad Universitaria (City University) is another name for:
Central University of Venezuela
National Autonomous University of Mexico (UNAM Main campus)
National University of Colombia (Universidad Nacional de Colombia)
University of Buenos Aires (Universidad de Buenos Aires)

See also:
City College (disambiguation)
College town
University City (disambiguation)
Metropolitan University (disambiguation)